Charles L. Towle (May 2, 1913 – April 9, 1990), of Arizona, was a stamp collector who studied postal history and wrote philatelic literature on the subject.

Collecting interests
Towle was a collector of stamps and postal history, especially that of United States railroad mail and mobile post offices.

Philatelic literature
On the basis of his studies, Towle, co-authored with Henry Albert Meyer, and wrote Railroad Postmarks of the U.S., 1861-1886, and, in 1986 Towle wrote his four volume United States Rates and Station Agent Markings. Towle wrote extensively on transit markings and received numerous awards for his effort.

For three years Towle edited The Heliograph, the journal of the Postal History Foundation.

Philatelic activity
Towle was active in philatelic organizations, such as the Mobile Post Office Society, where he was president until he died, and as Chairman of the Board of the Western Postal History Museum, later renamed the Postal History Foundation.

Honors and awards
Towle was named to the American Philatelic Society Hall of Fame in 1991.

See also
 Philately
 Philatelic literature
 Postal history

References
 Charles L. Towle

1913 births
1990 deaths
Philatelic authors
American philatelists
People from Arizona
American Philatelic Society